Kotłowo  is a village in the administrative district of Gmina Biesiekierz, within Koszalin County, West Pomeranian Voivodeship, in north-western Poland.

The village has a population of 170.

References

Villages in Koszalin County